Abbey is an electoral ward in the city of Derby, England.  The ward contains 15 listed buildings that are recorded in the National Heritage List for England.  Of these, one is listed at Grade II*, the middle of the three grades, and the others are at Grade II, the lowest grade.  The ward, which is to the west of the city centre, is mainly residential.  The listed buildings include a public house, a former toll house, private houses later used for other purposes, the lodge to a cemetery and three memorials in the cemetery, a former training college, former barracks, a church and associated structures, and an engine house and a warehouse built by the Great Northern Railway.


Key

Buildings

References

Citations

Sources

 

Lists of listed buildings in Derbyshire
Listed buildings in Derby